{new.and.improved|date=August 2023}

In user interface design, an interface metaphor is a set of [user interface] visuals, actions and procedures that exploit specific knowledge that users already have of other domains. The purpose of the interface metaphor is to give the user instantaneous knowledge about how to interact with the user interface. They are designed to be similar to physical entities but also have their own properties (e.g., desktop metaphor and web portals). They can be based on an activity, an object (Skeuomorph#), or a combination of both and work with users' unfamiliar knowledge to help them understand 'the unfamiliar', and placed in the terms so the user may better understand.

An example of an interface metaphor is the file and folder analogy for the file system of an operating system.  Another example is the tree view representation of a file system, as in a [[file tree
Source
]].

Generation of metaphors

Historical contributions
In the mid-twentieth century, computers were extremely rare and used only by specialists. They were equipped with complicated interfaces comprehensible only to these select few. In 1968, Douglas Engelbart gave a demonstration which astonished executives at Xerox. They began work on what would eventually become the Xerox Alto. In 1973, Xerox completed work on the first personal computer, the Xerox Alto, which had a sophisticated graphical user interface (GUI) involving windows, icons, menus and a pointer. (WIMP) Unfortunately, the Xerox Alto, and its successor the Xerox Star were far too expensive for the average consumer, and suffered from poor marketing. In 1984 Apple Computer launched the Apple Macintosh, which was the first affordable and commercially successful personal computer to include a graphical user interface. The Macintosh was the second Apple Computer to ship with a graphical user interface, with the Apple Lisa being the first. In 1985, Microsoft released Microsoft Windows which bore a striking resemblance to both Macintosh, and to the Alto's interface. Windows eventually overtook Apple in the PC market to become the predominant GUI-based operating system.

Evaluation
Software designers attempt to make computer applications easier to use for both novice and expert users by creating concrete metaphors that resemble the users' real-world experiences. Continual technological improvement has made metaphors depict these real-world experiences more realistically to ultimately enhance interface performance. Beginning users, however, could use a sort of help box, because the metaphor is not always going to be clear enough for them to understand, no matter how much effort its programmers devote to making it resemble something the users understand. Experts, on the other hand, understand what is going on with the technical aspects of an interface metaphor. They know what they want to do and they know how to do it—and so they design shortcuts to facilitate achieving their goals.

While the concept behind interface metaphors appears simple (to promote more efficient facilitation of a computer), a lack of empirical evidence exists to support these claims. Little research has actually been completed that demonstrates the benefits of implementing metaphors in computer systems as well as what makes a metaphor most effective.

See also
 Human–computer interaction
 Skeuomorph

References

Further reading
 Carroll, J. K., Mack, R. L. & Kellogg, W. A. (1988), Interface Metaphors and User Interface Design, in M. Helander (ed.), "Handbook of Human-Computer Interaction", Elsevier Science, pp. 67–85.
 Richards, S. M., et al. (1994) "The Use of Metaphors in Iconic Interface Design" in Intelligent Tutoring Media, Volume 5, Issue 2
 Zmoelnig, C. (2000). The graphical user interface. Time for a paradigm shift? Retrieved March 31, 2006 from http://www.sensomatic.com/chz/gui/index.html
 Vaananen K. and J. Schmidt (1994). "User Interface for Hypermedia: How to Find Good Metaphors?". In Proceedings of CHI'94. Boston, April 1994.

External links
 The Use of Metaphors in Iconic Interface Design
 Do Metaphors Make Web Browsers Easier to Use?
 Metaphors and the User Interface 
 Exploring Calabrian Culture: An Interactive Hypermedia Prototype

Software architecture
Metaphors by type